Patrick Allan (20 September 1892 – 15 July 1955) was a Scottish footballer who played as a forward, primarily for Clyde. Having joined the club in late 1911 from a team in Perth (details are not well documented) he was quickly involved in the run to the 1912 Scottish Cup Final but did not take part in Clyde's defeat to Celtic; however, he was in the side which claimed the Glasgow Cup in the 1914–15 season. In a career interrupted by World War I, Allan played for Scotland in one unofficial wartime international match.

References

1892 births
1955 deaths
Footballers from Stirling (council area)
Association football forwards
Scottish footballers
Scottish people of Irish descent
Clyde F.C. players
Hibernian F.C. players
Vale of Leven F.C. players
Dumbarton Harp F.C. players
Scottish Football League players
Scotland wartime international footballers